Rickey Isiah Justin McGill Jr. (born June 19, 1997) is an American professional basketball player who last played for Élan Béarnais Pau-Lacq-Orthez of the Betclic ELITE. He played college basketball for the Iona Gaels.

High school career
McGill attended Spring Valley High School. He helped lead Spring Valley to a 23-2 record during his senior season and an appearance in the state final four, earning Section 1's Mr. Basketball honors. McGill averaged 23.3 points per game. In the Class A regional final against Saugerties High School, McGill hit the game-winning buzzer-beating three-pointer and finished with 21 points and four assists. He finished second on Rockland County's all-time scoring list with 1,463 points.

College career
McGill averaged 2.8 points per game as a freshman at Iona and remained with the program even though coach Tim Cluess advised him to transfer. McGill entered the starting lineup in his following season. On February 25, 2018, he scored a career-high 40 points in a 110–101 loss to Rider. As a junior, McGill averaged 13.4 points, 5.6 assists and four rebounds per game, earning Second Team All-Metro Atlantic Athletic Conference (MAAC) honors. In his senior season, after leading Iona to the 2019 MAAC tournament title and winning most valuable player accolades, he became the first player in conference history to appear in the NCAA tournament for four straight years. McGill averaged 15.8 points, 4.8 assists and 4.5 rebounds per game and was named to the First Team All-MAAC.

Professional career
On August 22, 2019, McGill signed his first professional contract with Panionios of the Greek Basket League. He averaged 7.6 points, 2.7 rebounds and 3.5 assists per game and parted ways with the club after the league was suspended indefinitely due to the COVID-19 pandemic. On August 27, McGill signed with the Plymouth Raiders of the British Basketball League.

McGill began the 2021–22 season with Rapla KK of the Estonian league. He averaged 17.8 points, 3.4 rebounds, 6.0 assists and 2.4 steals per game in five games. On November 8, 2021, McGill signed with Soproni KC of the Hungarian Nemzeti Bajnokság I/A. On January 9, 2023, McGill signed with Élan Béarnais Pau-Lacq-Orthez of the French Betclic ELITE.

References

External links
Iona Gaels bio
Rickey McGill ProBallers Page

1997 births
Point guards
Living people
American expatriate basketball people in Estonia
American expatriate basketball people in Greece
American expatriate basketball people in Hungary
American expatriate basketball people in the United Kingdom
American men's basketball players
Basketball players from New York (state)
Élan Béarnais players
Iona Gaels men's basketball players
Panionios B.C. players
People from Spring Valley, New York
Plymouth Raiders players
Soproni KC players
American expatriate basketball people in France
American expatriate sportspeople in England